Glyptotermes minutus, is a species of damp wood termite of the genus Glyptotermes. It is found in Sri Lanka. It is a pest of dead wood of Albizia saman and dead wood of Cupressus knightiana.

References

External links

Glyptotermes
Insects described in 1932
Insects of Sri Lanka